Vandekerckhove is a surname. Notable people with the surname include:

Hans Vandekerckhove (born 1957), Belgian painter
Joël Vandekerckhove, Belgian scientist and academic